L'occasione, is the debut album by Italian producer Massimiliano Pani released in 1991.

The Album
His mother Mina appears on the album as part of the choir under the pseudonym of Queen Zoni. 
In the acknowledgments, Massimiliano Pani credits his mother as  "the greatest woman I've ever known. Ten years ago she decided to hire me as her assistant because she believed in me".

Mina has recorded Come stai, Robinson and  Non avere te for her album  Sorelle Lumière  and Torno venerdì on her album  Pappa di latteTrack listing

Musicians

Artists
 Massimiliano Pani- voice''

Arrangement and orchestra director
Massimiliano Pani – All tracks

References

1991 albums